Banksia lepidorhiza is a species of prostrate shrub that is endemic to Western Australia. It has underground stems, linear pinnatipartite leaves with sharply pointed lobes, pink, cream-coloured and yellow flowers in head of about thirty and egg-shaped follicles. It is only known from near Woodanilling.

Description
It has dull green, pinnatipartite leaves with between fifteen and twenty-five linear, sharply pointed lobes on each side.

Taxonomy and naming
This species was first formally described in 1996 by Alex George who gave it the name Dryandra lepidorhiza and published the description in the journal Nuytsia from a specimen he collected west of Woodanilling in 1986.

In 2007 Austin Mast and Kevin Thiele transferred all dryandras to the genus Banksia and renamed this species Banksia lepidorhiza.

Distribution and habitat
Banksia lepidorhiza is only known from the type location where it grows in low kwongan in the Avon Wheatbelt biogeographic region.

Conservation status
This banksia is classified as "Priority One" by the Government of Western Australia Department of Parks and Wildlife, meaning that it is known from only one or a few locations which are potentially at risk.

References

lepidorhiza
Plants described in 1996
Taxa named by Alex George